The 2007 Tour of Missouri is the inaugural edition of a professional road bicycle racing stage race held in Missouri that made its debut on September 11, 2007, with six days of racing. Run by same organizers as the Tour de Georgia and the Amgen Tour of California, the Tour of Missouri is being billed as the third highest profile domestic race in the United States. The Tour is part of the 2006–07 UCI America Tour and the inaugural 2007 USA Cycling Professional Tour.

The Missouri terrain is not mountainous by California and Georgia standards but expect three of the six stages to be contested on relentless rolling hills. No title sponsor has been announced. The planned course:

 Day 1: Kansas City, road race, out-and-back course starting and ending in the Plaza
 Day 2: Clinton–Springfield, road race
 Day 3: Branson, individual time trial
 Day 4: Lebanon–Columbia, road race
 Day 5: Jefferson City–St. Charles, road race
 Day 6: St. Louis, circuit race

Award Jerseys 

 For Stage 2, Zach Bell wore the Sprint Points Jersey.
 For Stages 3 and 4, Dominique Rollin wore the Sprint Points Jersey.
 Throughout the race, Svein Tuft (Symmetrics) wore the white jersey as leader of the 2006–07 UCI America Tour individual points standings.
 Throughout the race, Levi Leipheimer (Discovery Channel) wore the red-white-blue jersey as United States Road Race Champion.

Stages

Stage 1: 2007-09-11: Kansas City, Missouri out-and-back road race, 85 miles (136.8 km)

Stage 2: 2007-09-12: Clinton–Springfield road race, 125 miles (201.2 km)

Stage 3: 2007-09-13: Branson individual time trial, 18 miles (29 km)

Stage 4: 2007-09-14: Lebanon–Columbia road race, 133.4 miles (214.7 km)

Stage 5: 2007-09-16: Jefferson City–St. Charles, road race, 123 miles (198 km)

Stage 6: 2007-09-17: St. Louis circuit race, 74 miles (119.1 km)

Teams 
  Discovery Channel Pro Cycling Team (DSC)
  Saunier Duval–Prodir (SDV)
  DFL–Cyclingnews–Litespeed (DFL)
  Team Sparkasse (TSP)
  Health Net Pro Cycling Team Presented by Maxxis (HNM)
  Navigators Insurance Cycling Team (NIC)
  Team Slipstream Powered By Chipotle (TSL)
  Symmetrics Cycling Team (SYM)
  Tecos de la Universidad de Guadalajara (TUA)
  Toyota–United Pro Cycling Team
  BMC Racing Team (BMC)
  Jelly Belly Cycling Team (JBC)
  KodakGallery.com – Sierra Nevada Brewing Co. (OSN)
  Colavita / Sutter Home Presented by Cooking Light (COL)
  USA Cycling National Development Team (USA)

References
Official site
cyclingnews

2007
Tour of Missouri
Missouri, Tour of
2007 in sports in Missouri